Farrs Corner is an unincorporated community in Fairfax County, in the U.S. state of Virginia.

Located about five miles southeast of the Clifton, Virginia town proper and two miles north of Lake Ridge CDP, it features a Fairfax Station address. It is named after the junction between Virginia State Route 643, when it's called "Henderson Road", and Virginia State Route 610, when it is called Wolf Run Shoals Road.

Nearby neighborhoods include the Bull Subdivision, Ashleigh of Clifton, Crestridge and Stillwell Acres.

In popular culture
In the eleventh series X-Files episode 'This', Fox Mulder's address is given as the fictional 227700 Wallis Road, Farrs Corner.

References

Unincorporated communities in Virginia
Unincorporated communities in Fairfax County, Virginia
Washington metropolitan area